Sadique Hossain is an Indian writer of Bangla language and graphic designer  from West Bengal. He won Yuva Puraskar  in 2012.

Biography
Hossain was born on 11 December 1981 in Maheshtala, South 24 Parganas, West Bengal, India. He was a student of Rizwanur Rahman and he was a witness of his marriage too. After that, he was threatened he was asked to write that Rizwanur Rahman forced him to become his marriage witness.

Hossain started writing poems when he was a graduate student and started  writing short stories in 2007. For his short story collection Sammohan, he was awarded Yuva Puraskar  in 2012.

Bibliography

Poetry
 Debota O Poshupakhi (2007)

Short stories collection
 Sammohan (2009)
 Giyas Alir Prem O Tar Nijoswo Somoy (2013)
 Refugee Camp (2017)
 Harur Mahabharat (2019)

Novel
 Momen O Momena (2010)

References

1981 births
Bengali novelists
Bengali male poets
Living people
Indian graphic designers
People from South 24 Parganas district
Recipients of the Sahitya Akademi Yuva Puraskar
Writers from Kolkata